Flight 513 may refer to:

TWA Flight 513, crashed on 11 July 1946
Aeroflot Flight 513, crashed on 8 March 1965

0513